Virastyar (meaning "editing assistant") is a Persian add-in for Microsoft Word that performs Persian spell checking, character standardization, Pinglish transliteration, punctuation correction and calendar conversion. It can conjugate approximately 46,000 simple verb tense and use inflection and morphological rules to recognize possible extensions of a word. It covers approximately 2,800 non-verbal inflections for nouns, adjectives, adverbs, prepositions, numerals, classifiers, and pronouns.

Virastyar is mostly coded in Microsoft Visual C# using .NET Framework and is a free software, released under the GNU General Public License.

See also

Hunspell
GNU Aspell
Ispell
Enchant

References

External links 
 
 

Free spelling checking programs
Spell checkers